Mniszek may refer to:

People
 Adam Mniszek (1889-1957),  lieutenant colonel in the cavalry of the Polish Army  
Helena Mniszek (1878-1943), Polish writer

Places
Mniszek, Kuyavian-Pomeranian Voivodeship (north-central Poland)
Mniszek, Lublin Voivodeship (east Poland)
Mniszek, Masovian Voivodeship (east-central Poland)
Mniszek, Pomeranian Voivodeship (north Poland)
Mniszek, Świętokrzyskie Voivodeship (south-central Poland)

See also
 Mniszech family, a Polish noble family
 Mniszech coat of arms